Cuccia is a surname of Italian origin. Notable people with the surname include:

 Enrico Cuccia (1907–2000), Italian banker
 Francesco Cuccia, also known as Don Ciccio (1876–1957), Italian member of the Sicilian Mafia
 Paolo Cuccia (born 1953), Italian businessman
 Salvo Cuccia (born 1960), Italian cinema director and screenwriter
 Vincenzo Cuccia (1892–1979),  Italian fencer

See also
 Cuccìa, Sicilian meal

Italian-language surnames